Lech Dymarski (born 18 October 1949) is a Polish poet, opposition political activist in Communist Poland, state functionary in post-Communist Poland, member of regional legislature (Greater Poland Regional Assembly, 1998, 2002, 2006, 2010).

Awards
1990: Order of Polonia Restituta, Knight's Cross
2007: Order of Polonia Restituta, Officer's Cross
2014: Order of Polonia Restituta
2015: Cross of Freedom and Solidarity

References

1949 births
Living people
Polish poets
Polish politicians